The Saskatchewan Green Party is a political party in Saskatchewan, Canada.

The Green Party was founded in 1998 as the "New Green Alliance" (NGA) by environmental and social justice activists dismayed with the premiership of the Saskatchewan NDP's Roy Romanow. The NGA ran on an environmentally-focused and social democratic platform to the NDP's left in the 1999 and 2003 elections. In 2005, the NGA changed its name to the Green Party of Saskatchewan  although there is still no officially direct association with the Green Party of Canada.

The current party leader is Naomi Hunter.

Foundations and the New Green Alliance 

In the mid-1990s, a number of environmental and social justice activists began to organize against the perceived rightward drift of the governing New Democrats under Premier Roy Romanow. In April 1998, they held a news conference stating their intention "... to create a political party committed to protect the environment from corporate plunder and to advance a social justice agenda," and were officially registered with Elections Saskatchewan in January 1999. Much of the initial focus was on community activism over electoralism. Future Green Party leader Victor Lau would state that in his opinion, "... 20 per cent of the energy of the new party should be devoted to electoral politics and 80 per cent to promoting community projects like low-cost housing, new transit systems, or solar energy," while others looked to support the politics of Tommy Douglas, the first democratic socialist Premier of Saskatchewan, which they felt the NDP had drifted away from.

In 1999 the party was led by anti-nuclear activist Neil Sinclair, running 16 candidates province-wide and earning 1% of the vote, or rough 4% of the vote on average where they ran. In 2003, under Ben Webster, the party ran 27 candidates but lost support, earning only 0.55% of the vote province-wide.

Green Party of Saskatchewan 

In 2005, the NGA changed its name to come in line with the federal Greens, becoming the Green Party of Saskatchewan. The party would go through several short-term leaders between 2004 and 2006, when antiwar and anti-vaccination activist Sandra Finley became leader in time for the 2007 provincial election. The Green Party of Saskatchewan ran a much stronger campaign, fielding candidates in 48 out of 58 ridings with Green candidates. The GPS were able to capture 2.0% of the vote with candidates receiving anywhere between 1.23% to 6.24% of the vote. The highest was in the riding of Cumberland where the Green candidate placed ahead of the Liberal candidate. During the campaign, the GPS was led by Sandra Finley who ran in the riding of Saskatoon Nutana capturing 4.1% of the vote. Only three candidates were able to achieve a higher result.

On September 6, 2011, the day after Labour Day (and the unofficial kickoff for the 2011 provincial election campaign), Green Party Leader Larissa Shasko resigned to join the campaign of Regina South NDP candidate Yens Pedersen. Deputy Leader Victor Lau was elevated to become Party Leader, a decision that was reinforced by party members at a special leadership convention held on September 25, 2011. With little time to prepare, Victor and his team ran a full slate of 58 candidates, 43% of which were women. Although no Green Party MLAs were elected, the party emerged from the election as the third largest party in the province, after the Saskatchewan Party and the New Democratic Party.

Since the 2011 election, the party has begun an effort to organize on a constituency by constituency basis across the province. In March 2015, the party was rebranded as the Saskatchewan Green Party and ran a nearly full slate again in the 2015 general election under Lau, though fell back in vote share across the province.

In March 2020, Regina resident Naomi Hunter was named permanent leader of the Greens going into the 2020 general election. In the 2020 provincial election, the party won no seats in the legislature.

Election results

Party leaders 

 Neil Sinclair (1999–2002)
 Ben Webster (2002–2005)
 Neal Anderson (2005–2006)
 Victor Lau (2006)
 John Kern (2006)
 Sandra Finley (2006–2008)
 Amber Jones (2008–2009)
 Larissa Shasko (2009–2011)
 Victor Lau (2011–2016)
 Shawn Setyo (2016–2019)
 Richard Jack (2019-2020)
 Naomi Hunter (2020–present)

See also 
 List of Green party leaders in Canada
 List of Green politicians who have held office in Canada
 List of Saskatchewan general elections
 List of political parties in Saskatchewan
 Politics of Saskatchewan

References

External links 
 

 
1998 establishments in Saskatchewan
Environmental organizations based in Saskatchewan
Organizations based in Saskatoon
Political parties established in 1998
Provincial political parties in Saskatchewan